Virus was a French automobile.

Pierre Brissonnet was the owner of the Garage Renouvier in the Rue de Renouvier in Paris. He built cyclecars between 1930 and 1935. Designer of the cars was a certain Renaud. The cars had front-wheel drive and a two-stroke engine with 350 cc. The cars raced at the Bol d'Or.

Notes

References 
 Burgess Wise, David (2004). The New Illustrated Encyclopedia of Automobiles. Greenwich Editions.

Defunct motor vehicle manufacturers of France
Cyclecars